Tres Puntas is silver deposit and mine in Chile's Atacama Region. It is located 80 km north of the regional capital Copiapó. Tres Puntas was discovered in 1848 sparking the largest silver rush in Chile since Chañarcillo was discovered in 1832. The deposit was discovered by Miguel Osorio but came to be owned by Apolinario Soto.

References

Silver mines in Chile
Mines in Atacama Region
Former mines in Chile